Walace is a given name. It is an alternative spelling of the name Wallace. Notable people with the name include:

Walace (footballer, born 1989), full name Walace Alves da Silva, Brazilian football centre-back
Walace (footballer, born 1995), full name Walace Souza Silva, Brazilian football defensive midfielder
Walace (footballer, born 1993), full name Walace de Sousa Novais, Brazilian football defender

See also 

Wallace (given name)

Masculine given names